Holypaul Evan Septinus Soumilena (born 19 November 1996) is a Indonesian professional futsal player who plays for the club Indonesia Pro Futsal League, Black Steel Manokwari.

Club career
Evan Soumilena himself started his career as a professional futsal player since 2017 with Black Steel Manokwari.

International career
Evan started his international career while defending Indonesia national team at 2022 AFF Futsal Championship which was held in Thailand. In that tournament Evan scored 8 goals from 6 matches and brought his team to be runner-up after being defeated by Thailand national team in the final on penalties.

Achievements

Club
Black Steel Manokwari
Champion in Indonesia Pro Futsal League: 2020

National team
Indonesia
Runner-up in AFF Futsal Championship: 2022
Runner-up in Southeast Asian Games: 2022

Individual
Best player in Indonesia Pro Futsal League: 2020

International goals

References

External links 
 Evan Soumilena on Bolalob

Indonesian men's futsal players
1996 births
Living people
People from Papua (province)